Cornbrook railway station was opened on the south side of Cornbrook Road in the St. George's area of Manchester on 12 May 1856 by the Manchester South Junction and Altrincham Railway (MSJAR) to serve the nearby Pomona Gardens; there were four trains daily in each direction. It closed on 1 June 1865, the last trains having called on 31 May 1865.

References

Disused railway stations in Trafford
Former Manchester, South Junction and Altrincham Railway stations
Railway stations in Great Britain opened in 1856
Railway stations in Great Britain closed in 1865